is a Japanese light novel series written by Rin Fujiki and illustrated by THORES Shibamoto. The series began in 2007. A manga adaptation by Eiji Kaneda ran from 2012 to 2014, and a second one, illustrated by Anjue Hino, began serialization in 2016. An anime television series adaptation by J.C.Staff aired from July 7 to September 22, 2017.

Plot
The story follows two men, Hiraga Josef Kō and Roberto Nicholas, who work for the mysterious organization , an element of the Vatican dedicated to investigating alleged miracles; during their work, they usually find themselves involved in mysterious murder cases, which they often end up investigating.

Eventually they cross paths with Galdoune, an ancient organization that secretly aims to control the Vatican and since the Middle Ages is involved in obscure alchemic and scientific experiments in search of a way to reach immortality.

Characters

A young Japanese priest of the Vatican in charge of investigating alleged miracles all around the World. He has an exceptional talent for math and science, which assist him in his role of investigating miracles using a scientific approach.

Joseph's partner in investigations, he's an Italian priest with a great knowledge for syncretism and theology. He is passionate about ancient knowledge and books, and is well versed in ancient and foreign languages (he knows Greek, Latin, Arabic, Hebrew, English and German). It's later revealed that he was orphaned at the age of twelve, after his violent father killed his mother and fled.

The chief of the Seat of the Saints, and a member of the Congregation for the Causes of Saints, he's one of the most powerful men in the Vatican. He has a high respect for the dedication of Joseph and Roberto, to the point of protecting them if necessary from disciplinary sanctions.

A young Italian hacker known worldwide, he's a genius with an IQ above 200 who was involved in terrorist attacks and other crimes around the world. After his arrest by the Italian government, the Vatican obtained custody of him in order to make use of his exceptional talents. After losing a game with Joseph he agreed to cooperate with him and Roberto, providing them with support and consulting from within his cell. Due to his lack of morals and empathy, he's forced to wear a anklet filled with poison that will kill him immediately if he tries to contravene Vatican orders.

An FBI agent who went in Africa to solve the mysterious death of his friend Amy Boness. During his mission he met Joseph and Roberto, with whom he successfully resolved the case, without however capturing the culprit Julia. Suskins and the two priests meet again in Italy, where they cooperate once again to stop Julia's plans.

An apparently benevolent missionary of an African church, Joseph and Roberto meet him while investigating an alleged miracle in his mission. However, he's subsequently discovered to be a sinister Machiavellian leader of Galdoune.

Joseph's young brother who has a rare form of bone cancer that is slowly killing him. He is confined to a wheelchair in a special medical center in Germany for children with terminal illnesses. Joseph often suffers from visions or nightmares involving him. Later in the story it's revealed that since he was little he's been able to see the Angels of Death.

Media

Light novels
Rin Fujiki published the first novel in the series, with cover illustrations by THORES Shibamoto, in 2007. It and the second novel, which was released in 2009, were both published by Kadokawa Shoten. The series was transferred to Kadokawa's Horror Bunko imprint in 2010, which republished the first two novels before releasing the third in 2011.

Volumes

Manga
A manga adaptation by Eiji Kaneda launched in Kadokawa's Comic Kai magazine on January 24, 2012. The series was compiled into two volumes, published on February 20, 2013 and January 24, 2014.

Anjue Hino began serializing a second manga in the September 2016 issue of Media Factory's shōjo manga magazine Monthly Comic Gene on August 12, 2016.

Anime
An anime adaptation was announced in the December 2016 issue of Monthly Comic Gene on November 15, 2016. The adaptation was a television series, and aired from July 7 to September 22, 2017. The series ran for 12 episodes and an original video animation will also be released. Yoshitomo Yonetani directed at J.C.Staff and written by Seishi Minakami. Character designs is by Kazunori Iwakura. Screen Mode performed the opening theme "Mysterium". Nobuhiko Okamoto performed the ending theme. Sentai Filmworks have licensed the anime and streamed on Amazon Prime Video. MVM Films has licensed the series in the UK.

Reception
The series has sold over 950,000 copies in Japan.

See also
 Miracles - an American television series with similar elements.

References

External links
  at Kadokawa Shoten 
  
 

2017 anime television series debuts
2007 Japanese novels
Anime and manga based on light novels
Anime Strike
J.C.Staff
Kadokawa Dwango franchises
Kadokawa Shoten manga
Light novels
Media Factory manga
Mystery anime and manga
Novels set in Vatican City
Seinen manga
Sentai Filmworks
Shōjo manga